Odoyev (Russian: Одоев) is an urban settlement (Russian: рабочий посёлок) since 1959, in the west of Tula Oblast, Russia, the administrative center of Odoyevsky District. It sits on the left bank of the Upa river, a right-hand tributary of the Oka river, 75 km away from Tula. Odoyev had the status  of town prior to 1926.

History 
Odoyev was first mentioned in 1376, when Prince Roman Semyonovich of Novosil, relocated his seat from Novosil to here. However, the fortress of Oduyev, mentioned in 1242, is associated with Odoyev. In 1380 the town was mentioned in the Novgorod Chronicle, in regards with the battle of Kulikovo. However, it is safe to say that a stronghold here should have been since the times the land was occupied by the Vyatichi. Odoyev, alongside many other places in the basin of the Oka, was once within the territory of the Vyatichi. 

Since 1376, Odoyev was the center of a principality (or duchy). However, the Princes of Odoyev styled themselves dukes of Novosil, and sometimes dukes of Novosil and Odoyev up until the late 1400, while the title of Princes of Odoyev was fully adopted only by the mid-1500s. The seat in Odoyev, as the successor of Novosil, was considered the senior of the Upper Oka principalities. The Princely House of Odoyev died out in the 19th century. 

Odoyev's history was closely associated with its geopolitical location between the Grand Duchy of Lithuania, Moscow and the Golden Horde. The Duchy of Odoyev managed to maintain independence and be considered relatively sovereign state in the region's international relations up until the late 15th century.  Alongside other Russian duchies, the Duchy of Odoyev received the jarlig from the Khan of the Golden Horde. The first jarlig was obtained by the Duchy of Novosil in 1326. The Duchy of Odoyev had trade relations with the Horde, selling beaver and marten fur and honey and importing pottery, coins and iron caldrons. 

On May 20, 1407, Odoyev was captured and burned down by Lithuanian troops. By 1427 five princes of the House of Novosil and Odoyev had concluded a treaty with the Grand Duke of Lithuania, Vytautas, that became the basis for the future treaties with Lithuania. The treaty implied that Vytautas would not attack the lands of the Princes of Novosil and Odoyev, while the latter would be his vassals and serve to him, assisting in his foreign policy. Vitautas promised help in case of war without interfering in their relations with Moscow and Ryazan. The Princes of Novosil and Odoyev had the right to break the treaty in case of no desire to prolong it or violation of its conditions, upon the death of one of the parties. The Princes of Odoyev were given large lands in the Grand Duchy of Lithuania under the condition to pay yearly tribute from them.

In 1442, Prince Fyodor Lvovich of Novosil, the founder of the Vorotynsk princely house, alleged to Casimir IV, King of Poland and the Grand Duke of Lithuania. Prince Fyodor Lvovich was marked by anti-Moscow policy and even planned a plot against Vasily II. During his reign, junior princes of the House of Odoyev did not serve to the Duke of Moscow.

Since the end of the Lithuanian-Moscow war of 1433 — 1453, the situation had changed for the Upper Oka principalities. The principality of Mozhaysk lost its independence and the local prince escaped to Lithuania. Moscow seized lands from Kaluga to Aleksin, near Odoyev.

In 1459, Prince Fyodor Lvovich concluded a new treaty with Lithuania. In 1483 Prince Ivan Yuryevich of Novosil and Odoyev concluded yet another treaty with Lithuania. 

In the late 1400s — early 1500s, the Principality of Odoyev was torn between the Crimean Khanate, the Grand Duchy of Lithuania and the Duchy of Moscow. Odoyev went through multiple attacks from the Tatars: 1422, 1423, 1512, and 1562. 

In 1494, under the treaty between Moscow and Lithuania, the Principality of Odoyev became vassal to Moscow. In the early 1500s, Vasily III of Russia freed Odoyev of the Crimean tribute. Since that time the Princes of Odoyev served at the Moscow court as boyars. Odoyev started to decline. 

In the 16th century Odoyev was a typical stronghold on the southern frontier of Muscovy, when Ivan the Terrible took the town over from the House of Odoyev. But as early as in 1645, Odoyev was neglected, the towers of the fortress lost their roofs, the bridge had decayed, while the water well was empty. 

In the first half of the 18th century Odoyev was part of the Kiev, Smoleynsk and Moscow Governorates, up until 1777, when it ended up in Tula Governorate.

In 1777 Catherine the Great confirmed  a coat-of-arms for the town, which was based on the coat-of-arms of Chernigov.

In 1779 Catherine the Great confirmed the general city plan for Odoyev. By the early 1800s, the population of Odoyev was two thousand; the town had seven churches, seven taverns, and six plants, while in 1838 the first girls' boarding school in Tula Governorate was opened here. 

During the 1800s Odoyev was a trading town using the navigation on the Upa river. Then Odoyev had a racetrack holding regular horse races. Odoyev was famed for its gardens; almost every resident of the town owned one and it was covered in vegetation. The legend has it that the pastila from Antonovka apples from Odoyev was served at the dinner of Ivan the Terrible. 

In the early 16th century Princes of Vorotynsk built the Monastery of the Nativity of the Holy Mother, closed down in the 1700s and ruined in the Soviet times. Now its successor is the Anastasovo Monastery, located in the village of Anastasovo, near Odoyev. By the late 1800s, Odoyev had had six churches, but now only one is surviving, i.e. the Church of the Holy Trinity. In 1842 the local gentry initiated the opening of an amateur philanthropy theater. In 1912 there was founded an amateur wind band that still exists. In 1919 a musical school was founded in the town. 

In 1926 Odoyev was made a rural settlement, and in 1959 — a '"workers' settlement".

Now Odoyev is listed with the heritage settlements of Russia.

Economy 
The economy of Odoyev, as well as Odoyevsky District, in general, is primarily agricultural. The main focus of the local industry is dairy, fruit processing and baking. The district has two major plants: a butter dairy and a vegetable and fruit cannery.  57% of the district's population works in agriculture. Most of the district's output goes to Tula or is distributed in the Tula Oblast.

Culture and Tourism 

Odoyev is a small township that is continuously declining. The touristic potential of the place and the area is still to develop. The district is famed for its Filimonovo toys originating in the village of Filimonovo, 8 km away from Odoyev. The Filimonovo toys museum is located here. Odoyev also has a museum of local history.

Notable people born in Odoyev 

 Vladimir Uspensky (1927—2000), a Russian writer.

 Alexander Uvarov (1922—1994), a Soviet ice hockey player.
 Ivan Rodionov (1852—1881), a Russian poet.
 Konstantin Bogolepov (1913—1983), a Soviet scientist.

See also 

 Odoyevsky family

References 

Urban-type settlements in Tula Oblast
Odoyevsky Uyezd